Ben Witherington III (born December 30, 1951) is an American Wesleyan-Arminian New Testament scholar. Witherington is Professor of New Testament Interpretation at Asbury Theological Seminary, a Wesleyan-Holiness seminary in Wilmore, Kentucky, and an ordained pastor in the United Methodist Church.

Biography
Witherington was born on December 30, 1951, in High Point, North Carolina. He is son of Ben, a banker and Joyce West, a piano teacher. On June 1, 1977, Witherington married Ann E. Sears, an educator. He had two children, Christy Ann and David Benjamin. On January 11, 2012 Witherington's daughter, died of a pulmonary embolism.

Witherington attended the University of North Carolina at Chapel Hill and graduated in 1974 with a Bachelor of Arts degree in English, along with minors in Philosophy and Religious Studies. He holds a Master of Divinity degree from Gordon-Conwell Theological Seminary (1977) and a Ph.D. from the Durham University in England (1981).

Career
From 1984 to 1995 he was professor of New Testament at Ashland Theological Seminary. He is currently "Jean R. Amos" Professor of New Testament for Doctoral Studies at Asbury Theological Seminary (1995-) Witherington has also taught at Vanderbilt University,  and on the doctoral faculty at St. Andrews University in Scotland. 

From 1982 to 1983 he had been a faculty member of the Duke Divinity School, and the High Point College. In 1988, 1990, 1992, he was a visiting professor of the Gordon–Conwell Theological Seminary. He was a research fellow (1992), and member (1996) at the Robinson College from the Cambridge University.

He is a member of the Society of Biblical Literature, Society for the Study of the New Testament and the Institute for Biblical Research.

In 1982, he was ordained as a Methodist elder. Witherington has presented seminars for churches, colleges and biblical meetings in the United States, England, Estonia, Russia, Europe, South Africa, Zimbabwe and Australia. He has also led tours to Italy, Greece, Turkey, Israel, Jordan, and Egypt.
His books The Jesus Quest and The Paul Quest were selected as top biblical studies works by the Evangelical magazine Christianity Today. Witherington has been seen on the History Channel, NBC, ABC, CBS, CNN, The Discovery Channel, A&E and PAX Network. He was featured in the BBC and PBS special entitled The Story of Jesus.

Theology 
Witherington is a prominent evangelical scholar. He is Wesleyan Armininan in his theology. In The Problem with Evangelical Theology Witherington strongly challenges the exegetical foundation of Calvinism on each of its distinctive tenets. He often insists on the possibility of apostasy of the believer and the related doctrine of conditional preservation of the saints (conditional security). He generally refers to the character of God, the nature of his grace and his love as a justification for his soteriology. He is also a devout pacifist.

Selected works

Books
Witherington has written over sixty books.

Articles
Witherington has written articles in different journals as: Ashland Theological Journal, Bible Q & A,  Beliefnet, Bible Review, Biblical Archaeology Review, Christian History, Christianity Today, Journal of Biblical Literature, New Testament Studies, North Carolina Christian Advocate, Quarterly Review, Tyndale Bulletin, UM Publishing House.

Notes and references

Citations

Sources

External links

 Ben Witherington III introduction website
 Ben Witherington on Patheos
 Ben Witherington on Beliefnet
 Ben Witherington on Seedbed

1951 births
Academics of the University of St Andrews
American biblical scholars
American United Methodist clergy
Arminian ministers
Arminian theologians
Asbury Theological Seminary faculty
Christian bloggers
Christian writers
Critics of the Christ myth theory
Gordon–Conwell Theological Seminary alumni
Living people
New Testament scholars
University of North Carolina at Chapel Hill alumni
Alumni of Durham University Graduate Society
Vanderbilt University faculty